FC Lokomotiv Vitebsk is a defunct Belarusian football club from Vitebsk.

History
The club was formed in 1986 as SKB Vitebsk. During Soviet years the club played in Belarusian SSR league. In 1992 they were renamed to SKB-Lokomotiv Vitebsk and joined newly created Belarusian Premier League. In the summer of the same year, they updated the name to Lokomotiv Vitebsk.

In 1995, Lokomotiv relegated to the First League. After three seasons, they relegated again (to the Second League), and after the 2000 season, the club was dissolved. During 1996–2000, the club acted as a farm club of Lokomotiv-96 Vitebsk.

Name changes
1986: founded as SKB Vitebsk
1992: renamed to SKB-Lokomotiv Vitebsk
1992: renamed to Lokomotiv Vitebsk
2001: disbanded

League and Cup history

1 Last round match cancelled and never replayed.

References

External links
 Profile at footballfacts.ru

Defunct football clubs in Belarus
Sport in Vitebsk
1986 establishments in Belarus
2001 disestablishments in Belarus
Association football clubs established in 1986
Association football clubs disestablished in 2001